Greatest Hits, Vol. 1 (also titled as The Essence of Rare Essence: Greatest Hits Vol. 1) is a greatest hits album by Washington, D.C.-based go-go band Rare Essence.  The album was released on December 12, 1995, and consist of a compilation of ten songs from their previously released studio and live albums, including "Work the Walls", "Do the Mickey", "Body Moves", and "Do You Know What Time It Is".

Track listing

Personnel
 Charles "Shorty Corleone" Garris – vocals
 Andre "Whiteboy" Johnson – electric guitar, vocals
 Michael "Funky Ned" Neal – bass guitar
 Donnell Floyd – vocals, saxophone
 Kent Wood – keyboards
 Milton "Go-Go Mickey" Freeman – congas, percussion
 Derick Paige – trumpet, vocals

References

External links
Rare Essence Greatest Hits, Vol. 1 at Discogs

1995 greatest hits albums
Rare Essence albums